Ardara is a small town in County Donegal, Ireland. It is located on the N56 and R261 roads. The population as of the 2016 census was 732. The population of 731 at the 2011 Census represented an increase of about 30% since 2006. In 2012, The Irish Times named it the best village in which to live in Ireland.

History
The Donegal County Directory for 1862 shows the administrative positions that were held in the county in that year, including several in Ardara. There is a photograph of Brendan Behan in Ardara with a glass of tomato juice while visiting Gildea's (now the Beehive) in 1960.

Notable people

 Bibi Baskin, television personality
 Damian Diver, Gaelic footballer
 John Doherty, musician
 Eileen Flynn, Traveller activist and Senator
 Martin Gavigan, Gaelic footballer
 Paddy McGrath, Gaelic footballer
 Anthony Molloy, captained Donegal in their first All-Ireland Senior Football Championship title-winning season in 1992
 Pat Shovelin, Donegal goalkeeping coach in their second All-Ireland Senior Football Championship title-winning season in 2012

See also
 List of populated places in Ireland
 Market Houses in the Republic of Ireland

References

External links

 Local news and information on Ardara

Towns and villages in County Donegal